Night School (also known as Terror Eyes in the United Kingdom) is a 1981 American slasher film directed by Ken Hughes and starring Rachel Ward, in her film debut, Leonard Mann, and Drew Snyder. The plot revolves around a series of brutal murders in Boston, Massachusetts. Alfred Sole was the film's original director, but he passed on the project. Hughes was ultimately brought in to direct, and Night School was his final film.

The music score was composed by Brad Fiedel.

The film premiered at the Avoriaz Fantastic Film Festival in 1981.

Night School was released theatrically in the United States on September 11, 1981, and was panned by critics upon release. In England, it became a video nasty.
The film has developed a small cult following among slasher fans, and was given its first DVD release by Warner Archive with a remastered transfer in 2011.

Plot

Anne Barron is a teacher's aide at a daycare center in Boston. One evening, she is relaxing on the playground carousel when someone pulls up on a motorcycle, wearing a black motorcycle helmet. She is startled as the stranger pulls out a kukri and starts spinning the carousel. The terrified Anne goes around until the kukri hits her. Lt. Judd Austin is the policeman assigned to the case. As he gets to the scene, he sees the girl decapitated with her head in a nearby bucket. The distraught director of the center tells Judd that Anne worked there during the day and was attending night classes at Wendall College.

At the hospital, Judd and his partner Taj discuss a similar case from the previous week, in which another girl was found decapitated with her head in a pond. They wonder if there's any connection between the two murders. At Wendell, the administrator Helene Griffin tells Judd that Anne was close to a girl named Kim Morrison. When asked if Anne had a boyfriend, Kim tells Judd that Anne was indeed involved with someone, but she doesn't know who. Judd enters Professor Millett's anthropology class to speak with him about Anne. The professor doesn't provide much information, but he introduces Judd to an exchange student named Eleanor Adjai. Eleanor leaves the school and goes to the local diner. There, she is creeped out by Gary, the busboy who appears to have mental issues. The waitress Carol asks Eleanor if she's in Millett's class and implies that he sleeps around, irritating Eleanor and she leaves. Gary follows her home. When she realizes this, she runs the rest of the way and quickly locks her door. She gets into the shower but someone tries to break in. Frightened, she gets out of the shower, only to find that it's Professor Millett, her boyfriend who had been locked out by accident.

Kim works at the local aquarium. About to leave work, she takes off her diving suit and is decapitated by the figure in a motorcycle helmet. A woman who was previously looking at the turtles screams after she sees Kim's head fall into the tank. Judd pays a visit to Professor Millett and is surprised to see Eleanor, who explains that she is his research assistant. Judd then informs Millett that a second student of his has been killed and asks him if he has had any affairs with his pupils. Annoyed by the question, Millett tells Judd to leave. Eleanor and Millett get into an argument and she goes to the diner to be alone. The professor follows her, and she tells him that she is three months pregnant. He's sympathetic, although he still manages to flirt with Carol. After the diner has closed, Carol is left to clean up. When the power goes out, she heads to the basement to investigate. The killer appears and attacks her. Carol escapes, but is then caught in an alley and killed. The next day, Carol's head is found in a water-filled sink and her body in a dumpster. Judd and Taj go to Gary' house since he is now considered a prime suspect, but Judd doesn't believe he was involved.

When Judd goes to Professor Millett's home again, he finds a collection of skulls taken from tribal headhunters from around the world. Eleanor doesn't see anything wrong with this. At Wendell, Helene tells Millett to stop sleeping around with his students and counsels student Kathy, who confesses that she too has been intimate with the professor. Helene invites the girl to spend the night at her house, resulting in the two sleeping together. Helene is killed when she gets up to answer the phone, and Kathy is killed shortly after discovering Helene's head in the toilet.

Judd is on his way to speak to Helene when he sees the killer fleeing. He chases the killer to Professor Millett's apartment. Inside, the killer is revealed to be Eleanor. She confesses the killings to her boyfriend and justifies the crimes by comparing them to tribal rituals he teaches in his courses. As the police are approaching, Millett puts on the helmet and flees on his motorcycle to divert the suspicion from Eleanor. During a chase with Judd and Taj, Millett is struck by a car and killed. Eleanor attends his burial and the police believe the case has been solved, although it is implied that Judd suspects Eleanor was the killer and Millett sacrificed his life to protect her. However, the case is closed and Eleanor moves back to England. After the case is closed, Judd gets in his car and is suddenly attacked by the killer, only to reveal it was a prank by Taj.

Cast

Rachel Ward as Eleanor Adjai
Leonard Mann as Lt. Judd Austin
Drew Snyder as Vincent Millett
Joseph R. Sicari as Taj
Nicholas Cairis as Gus
Karen MacDonald as Carol Mann
Annette Miller as Helene Griffin
Bill McCann as Gary 
Margo Skinner as Stevie Cabot
Kevin Fennessy as Harry
Elizabeth Barnitz as Kim Morrison
Holly Hardman as Kathy
Meb Boden as Anne Barron
Leonard Corman as Priest
Belle McDonald as Marjorie Armand
Ed Higgins as Coroner

Production
Night School was shot on location in Boston, Massachusetts, largely in the Beacon Hill neighborhood, in the spring of 1980 on a budget of $1.2 million. It was the second feature film to be near-exclusively shot in Boston, after The Brink's Job. The final sequence however, tacked on after principal photography, was filmed in New York City.

The film was going to be directed by Alfred Sole who made Tanya's Island with Vanity, who was going to star in Night School, but Sole and Vanity (who was using the stage name D.D. Winters at the time) dropped out of the film. Ken Hughes took over as director. Rachel Ward was cast after being spotted on the cover of a magazine.

Producer Ruth Avergon recalled of working with director Ken Hughes: "Ken had enormous energy ... I just loved working with him. He was a joy to work with. He really knew what he was doing. There wasn't a lot of second guessing. He knew what shots had to be taken for our budget. The production value that he gave us, along with Mark Irwin [cinematographer], was wonderful. I thought they really captured a nice look for the film".

Irwin said "Ken was a true genius with staging, blocking, timing, pacing and performance and had the classic British mix of sarcasm and self-deprecating humor. I learned a huge amount from him and would watch him formulate coverage as the actors read the scene".

Release

Critical response
Vincent Canby of The New York Times dismissed the film as "a not very scary story" in a short review. Variety called it "a low budget exercise in terror offering very little diversion or novelty for fans of the already gutted 'psychotic slasher' genre". Richard Harrington of The Washington Post wrote that the film "aspires to something more, but ends up falling back on a half-dozen killings and the grizzly uncovering of the victims' heads. If the script is a little faulty and obvious, Mark Irwin's cinematography almost makes up for it. Irwin works with a subtle palette and his 1981 Boston is suffused with the vivid dampness and ember glow of Jack the Ripper's London (without the fog)". Robert Brown of The Monthly Film Bulletin declared: "Basic shortcomings in writing, performances and direction, combined with the unnerving relish with which the film carves up its hapless female victims, allow little scope for either genuine horror or a parody of the same". George Anderson of the Pittsburgh Post-Gazette called the film "one of the tamest ... horror flicks to date".

Retrospective assessment has noted the film's mixture of slasher films with Italian gialli films and police procedurals. Film scholar Adam Rockoff deemed the film  "grim" and one of the "slickest-looking slasher" films.

Home media
Night School was released on VHS videocassette in October 1985 by CBS/Fox Video under its Key Video and on DVD-R through the Warner Archive Collection on November 2, 2011. In October 2017, Warner Archive released the film for the first time on Blu-ray in a remastered transfer.

Alternative titles
The film was initially released in Spain under the title Psicosis 2, in an attempt to mislead the public into assuming this was a sequel to Psycho two years before the actual sequel came out. This was part of a similar trend in Spain and Italy; other examples are films deceptively titled Alien 2, Tiburón 3 (literally Jaws 3) or La Casa 3, standing for a third sequel to The Evil Dead.

References

Works cited

External links
 
 
 
Night School at Letterbox DVD
Night School at TCMDB

1981 films
1980s horror thriller films
1980s mystery films
1980s slasher films
1980s serial killer films
American slasher films
Films directed by Ken Hughes
1981 horror films
Paramount Pictures films
American serial killer films
Films scored by Brad Fiedel
Erotic slasher films
American erotic horror films
Video nasties
Films set in Boston
Films shot in Boston
1980s English-language films
1980s American films